Dmytro Kozban (born 27 April 1989) is a professional Ukrainian football striker.

He has previously played Inter Boyarka, FC Lviv, Knyazha Schaslyve, Nafkom Brovary, Nyva Vinnytsia, Avanhard Kramatorsk, Volyn Lutsk and Veres Rivne.

Career
On 4 July 2017, Kozban signed a contract with III liga club Motor Lublin.

Kozban was recognized as the best player of November 2019 in the Ukrainian Premier League.

References

External links
 Profile on Official FC Lviv Website
 
 

1989 births
Living people
Footballers from Kramatorsk
Ukrainian footballers
Ukrainian expatriate footballers
FC Inter Boyarka players
FC Lviv players
FC Knyazha Shchaslyve players
FC Knyazha-2 Shchaslyve players
FC Nafkom Brovary players
FC Nyva Vinnytsia players
FC Kramatorsk players
FC Volyn Lutsk players
NK Veres Rivne players
Motor Lublin players
FC Kremin Kremenchuk players
FC Ahrobiznes Volochysk players
Speranța Nisporeni players
Expatriate footballers in Poland
Expatriate footballers in Moldova
Ukrainian expatriate sportspeople in Poland
Ukrainian expatriate sportspeople in Moldova
Association football forwards
Ukrainian Premier League players
Ukrainian First League players
Ukrainian Second League players
Moldovan Super Liga players